Natasha Hadiza Akpoti (born 9 December 1979) is a Nigerian Barrister, Social Entrepreneur and Politician. She ran for the post of Senator for Kogi Central Senatorial District under Social Democratic Party (SDP) in the year 2019.
She contested in the 2019 Kogi State Gubernatorial Election which was held on 16 November 2019.
She is the founder of Builders Hub Impact Investment Program (BHIIP).

Early life and education
Natasha Hadiza Akpoti was born on 9 December 1979, she is the second of four children and the only daughter of a Nigerian father and a Ukrainian mother. Her mother, Ludmila Kravchenk, is a Ukrainian from Rakitna in the region of Chernivtsi. Her father, Dr. Jimoh Abdul Akpoti, is from Obeiba-Ihima, Kogi State. She spent her early years in Ihima, Okene Local Government
She lost her father in 1998 and the family had to relocate.
She studied at the University of Abuja from 2000 to 2004 and graduated with a Bachelor of Laws degree. She was called to the Nigerian bar in 2005 upon graduation from the Nigerian Law School in Abuja. In 2011, she proceeded to the University of Dundee and graduated with a Master of Laws degree in 2012. She holds a Master of Business Administration in Oil & Gas Management from the University of Dundee.

Career
After graduation from the Nigerian Law School, she worked with Brass NLG as a legal counsel from 2007 to 2010. In 2015, she established Builders Hub Impact Investment Program (BHIIP).
She came to national prominence after presenting an investigative report to the National Assembly on 1 March 2018 on corrupt activities regarding the Ajaokuta steel mill. The report detailed the repetitive waste of government funds and embezzlement since the initial construction of the steel mill which has remained moribund despite multiple attempts to get it running. The report was opposed by the Federal ministry of mines and steel development and Akpoti was accused of deliberately misinforming the House of Representatives. An association of small scale steel dealers also alleged that Akpoti was running a sponsored campaign to discredit the government and enrich some corporate interests.
A High Court sitting in Abuja ordered that the publisher of Authority newspaper, Ifeanyi Uba and Williams Orji should pay the sum of ten million naira damages to Natasha Akpoti for their libelous publication against her.

Political career
In 2018, she declared her intentions to run for the office of Senator representing Kogi Central in the Nigerian Senate under the umbrella of the Social Democratic Party (SDP). On 25 May 2022 Natasha won the PDP’s primaries  for the 2023 Kogi Centre Senatorial Elections to face Abubakar Ohere who picked the APC ticket. 

In February 2023, a few days to the senatorial elections, in a bid to forestall transportation of electoral materials to the district elections, it is alleged that the Yahaya Bello-led Kogi State government excavated portions of the road linking to her senatorial district, however the government stated that the excavations were done to prevent access by hoodlums who have made the route a thoroughfare for themselves. 16b

She contested for the senetorial seat under the PDP with  52,132 votes,against Sadiku-Ohere of the APC with 51,763 votes, and she lost to her opponnent with a difference of 369 votes between them.

Personal life
Akpoti hails from Okehi in Kogi State. She is from Ebiraland.
She is a mother of three. On 5 March 2022, she married the Alema of Warri, Chief Emmanuel Uduaghan (not to be confused with the ex-governor Emmanuel Uduaghan), in a ceremony at her native home in Ihima.

References

1979 births
Living people
People from Kogi State
21st-century Nigerian lawyers
21st-century Nigerian women politicians
21st-century Nigerian politicians
Social Democratic Party (Nigeria) politicians
Nigerian women lawyers
Alumni of the University of Dundee
21st-century women lawyers